Solano may refer to:

Places
 California State Prison, Solano
 San Francisco Solano, a town in Almirante Brown Partido, Argentina
 Solano Avenue, a street in Berkeley and Albany, California, in the United States
 Solano castle, a  colonial castle in Puerto Cabello, Venezuela
 Solano County, California, in the United States
 Solano, Caquetá, Colombia
 Solano, Chiriquí, a corregimiento in Bugaba District, Panama
 Solano, New Mexico
 Solano, Nueva Vizcaya, a municipality in the Philippines

People
 Solano (surname)
 Chief Solano (1798–1851), American Indian leader
 Solano (people), a people on the Texas-Coahuila border between the United States and Mexico
 Solano language, a little-known extinct language spoken by the Solano people

Other
 Solano (ferry), a large railroad ferry in service 1879–1930 between Benicia and Port Costa, California
 Solano (wind), an eastern wind in Spain